Bertil Fredrik Eugene "Nocke" Nordenskjöld (24 May 1891 – 17 March 1975) was a Swedish football midfielder who played at the 1920 Summer Olympics.

Representing Djurgården 1909–20, Nordenskjöld played 11 Svenska Mästerskapet finals, including replays, and won four.
He made eight appearances for Sweden between 1910 and 1920. He debuted for Sweden on 11 September 1910 in a friendly against Norway on Frogner stadion.

Honours
Djurgårdens IF
 Svenska Mästerskapet: 1912, 1915, 1917, 1920

References

External links 

1891 births
1975 deaths
Association football midfielders
Swedish footballers
Swedish football managers
Djurgårdens IF Fotboll players
Djurgårdens IF Fotboll managers
Sweden international footballers
Olympic footballers of Sweden
Footballers at the 1920 Summer Olympics